First Baptist Church is a historic church in Garden City, Minnesota, United States.  The town, along the Watonwan River, was originally established in 1856 as Fremont.  A Baptist congregation was formed in the community in 1858, and eight years later, the church was formally organized.  In 1867, the membership split amidst a disagreement between members who wanted a more aggressive evangelical mission and members who wanted the status quo.  One of the groups moved ahead with plans to build a church, contracting for the delivery of logs to a nearby sawmill.  The sawmill was unable to receive the logs before winter came, though, and the logs were washed away in spring flooding.

The congregation then made plans to build a church from concrete blocks made in the town by the firm of Geist and Hentzelman. This structure is believed to be the earliest in the state built of concrete block or artificial stone. The structure was dedicated on January 17, 1869, and the two groups reunited and used it jointly.

Congregationalists and Presbyterians also held services in this building for a time as a combined congregation.

It was listed on the National Register of Historic Places in 1980.

References

Baptist churches in Minnesota
Churches in Blue Earth County, Minnesota
Churches on the National Register of Historic Places in Minnesota
Churches completed in 1868
National Register of Historic Places in Blue Earth County, Minnesota
1868 establishments in Minnesota
Greek Revival church buildings in Minnesota